The soft sculpin (Psychrolutes sigalutes) is a species of marine ray-finned fish belonging to the family Psychrolutidae, the fatheads and toadfishes. This species is found in the North Pacific Ocean from the Bering Sea to the southern  Puget Sound in Washington.

References

Psychrolutes
Fish described in 1895
Taxa named by David Starr Jordan
Taxa named by Edwin Chapin Starks